The Madison Scouts Drum and Bugle Corps is a World Class competitive junior drum and bugle corps based in Madison, Wisconsin. The Madison Scouts were one of the thirteen founding member corps of Drum Corps International (DCI), and are a two-time DCI World Champion. Until 2018, when the Madison Scouts featured a female performer for only the fourth time in their history, naming her the "first female full-member" of the corps, they had remained one of only two all-male corps. In July 2019, the Madison Scouts adopted a non-discrimination policy that expands membership to both genders to participate in the Madison Scouts, effectively opening the way for women to become members of the corps.

History
The corps originated on December 3, 1920 under the direction of Lewis Kessler and maintained an active performance schedule through the end of 1925.

Leadership changes in the Council combined with flagging participation in Scouting resulted in the corps activity being paused in the fall of 1925. Attempts were made in 1928 and 1930 to restart the corps but to no avail, likely hampered by the Great Depression. A revitalization of the Council began in 1935, which saw the return of Lewis Kessler's involvement.

In October 1937, the Four Lakes Council began to actively recruit members to restart the corps. The 1938 redux would have E.J. Hess as its director and Clarence H. Beebe as the corps' director, a position he would hold for thirty years until his death in 1968 The advisory committee to guide the musical unit included none other than Lewis Kessler, the original corps director.

In its early days, the corps performed concerts and appeared in many local parades.  During World War II the corps participated in War Bond rallies.  The corps was split in 1951, with the older members becoming the Madison Explorer Scouts and the younger assigned to the Madison Junior Scouts, a cadet "feeder" corps for the older unit.

In 1954 the Explorer Scouts entered field competitions and, in their first "national" competition, finished second at the VFW Nationals in Philadelphia.  They repeated as runners-up at Boston in 1955.  In 1956, they attended the American Legion Nationals in Los Angeles and also placed second.  They were then finalists at VFW Nationals from 1957 through 1962, and also made American Legion Finals in 1958 and 1959.  In the early 1960s the corps switched from Explorer Scout uniforms to West Point cadet style uniforms.  While attending VFW Nationals from 1964 through 1969, they made a finals appearance only with a 10th place tie in 1966. In 1969, Bill Howard became corps director, and the corps returned to wearing Explorer uniforms.  The corps made immediate improvements and returned to VFW finals in 1970 and 1971.

In 1971, at the urging of Cavaliers founder Don Warren and Troopers founder Jim Jones, the Blue Stars, Cavaliers, Madison Scouts, Santa Clara Vanguard, and Troopers formed the Midwest Combine. This was in reaction to the rigid, inflexible rules of the American Legion and VFW (the primary rule makers and sponsors of both corps and shows), and the low or nonexistent performance fees paid for appearing in the various competitions. The corps felt that the existing competitive circuits stifled creativity and starved corps financially. (A similar group of Eastern corps, the United Organization of Junior Corps, also known as the Alliance, was formed by the 27th Lancers, Garfield Cadets, Boston Crusaders, Blessed Sacrament Golden Knights, and Blue Rock.) The Combine members believed that member corps should be able to make their own rules, operate their own competitions and championships, and keep the bulk of the monies earned. For the 1971 season, the corps stuck together, offering show promoters the five corps as a package. Despite pressure on show sponsors, judges, and other drum corps, the Combine corps booked into a number of shows together. They even hosted a multi-corps competition themselves, which was a spectacular success despite fears of failure that lasted until a standing-room-only crowd arrived at the last moment.

In 1972 all ten corps from the Midwest Combine and the Alliance—plus the Anaheim Kingsmen, Argonne Rebels, and De La Salle Oaklands—were founding members of Drum Corps International, which remains the sanctioning body for junior corps in North America. At the first DCI World Championships in Whitewater, Wisconsin, the Scouts finished in fourteenth in a competition that featured thirty-nine corps from the East, the South, the West Coast, the Midwest and Great Plains, and Canada.  In 1973, the Scouts rose all the way up to fourth place. The following year they were DCI runners-up, and in Philadelphia in 1975, the Madison Scouts became the third corps to win the DCI World Championship. Throughout the 1970s the Scouts became regulars in CYO Nationals as well, making Finals in 1973 through 1979 and winning in 1974 and 1975.

In 1980, after sixteen previous appearances and ten prior Finals, the Madison Scouts tied for 1st place with The Cavaliers at VFW Nationals in Chicago.  That year they toured Canada, finishing sixth at the DCI Finals in Birmingham, Alabama, with only a 3.55 points difference between first and sixth. At this time the corps started working towards composing the entire staff with Scouts alumni, with Bill Howard stepping down and being replaced by Scott Stewart as corps director.

Through the 1980s Madison stayed in DCI Finals but generally never made it to the championship level.  In June 1988, after winning their first five Drum Corps Midwest (DCM) shows, the Madison Scouts went to Europe as part of their fiftieth anniversary celebration. They presented clinics and performed in exhibition at contests that included all of the corps from Great Britain, the Netherlands, and Germany.  The corps returned to find themselves trailing Phantom Regiment, Star of Indiana, and The Cavaliers at the DCM Championships in DeKalb, Illinois. At DCI Midwest in Whitewater, they were behind the Santa Clara Vanguard and Blue Devils.  Improving as the season went on, by DCI South in Birmingham, Alabama, they trailed only Santa Clara.  And, by DCI Semifinals in Kansas City, Missouri, the Madison Scouts were in command, with a performance that left the crowd screaming for more.  They gave more in Finals and won their second DCI World Championship.

In 1990 the organization dropped the name Scouts from the corporate name and allowed the charter for Boy Scout Troop 600 to lapse, although the corps remained affiliated with Scouting for another two decades.  The Scouts began the conversion to three valve horns in 1991.  By 1992, Madison was marching more than a dozen members from outside the U.S., with members coming from Canada, Great Britain, Japan, and the Netherlands.  In 1995 the Junior Scouts merged with the Capitolaires Drum and Bugle Corps, an all-girl corps from Madison.  The resulting coed Capital Sound Drum and Bugle Corps would operate under the Madison banner, and the Capitolaires' bingo game further solidified the Scouts' finances.  Southwind Drum and Bugle Corps was brought into the Madison organization in 1997, relocating from Montgomery, Alabama to Lexington, Kentucky in order to compete in DCM.  Through the 1990s, the Scouts would continue to place as a Finalist in DCI with a series of successful programs. m

The century turned with the Madison Scouts still in the DCI Top Twelve.  In 2002, South Africa was added to the list of countries represented in the corps' membership, and Scott Stewart retired after a fourteenth-place finish at the 2002 DCI Finals, at home in Camp Randall Stadium.  This was the first year the Scouts had not placed in the Top Twelve since 1973, and only the second time that the Scouts had missed Finals in DCI's 31 seasons.  The corps would return to Finals in 2003-2006, but with frequent staff turnover they fell to fifteenth in 2007 and again in 2009.  The Organization would also sever its ties to both Capitol Sound and Southwind.

In 2010 Jim Mason, former director of Star of Indiana and its offshoots, was hired as program coordinator / artistic director. The Madison Scouts returned to DCI Finals under his guidance in 2010 through 2014. In 2014 Mason's petitions to DCI brought about a major change of format: for the first time, any brass instrument was allowed in field competition. The Scouts' 2014 show featured a trombone quartet to some controversy.

2015 brought the return of Scott Boerma, who had previously arranged Madison's music from 1989-2006, as brass arranger. The Scouts achieved a momentary rise to 8th place that year. However, success did not last long, as the corps dipped to their lowest-ever positions of 16th place in 2018 and 17th in 2019 thus marking the first time the corps missed finals in back to back years.

2019 the corps made a sweeping change to the design and instructional team. Madison Scout alumnus, Jason Robb was hired as program coordinator / artistic director and Nicholas Monzi as Educational Director. The 2020 production was never announced before the COVID19 pandemic hit.

Sponsorship
The Madison Scouts are sponsored by Forward Performing Arts Association, Inc., a 501 (c) (3) musical organization. The Executive Director is Chris Komnick and the Programs Director is David Lofy.

Since 2017 the organization has also sponsored the Mad Brass SoundSport team, a marching band competing in DCI's SoundSport activity. In 2018 the organization will add Fleurish Winds, a coed ensemble that will perform in WGI Winds.

Show summary (1972–2022) 
Source:

Caption awards
At the annual World Championship Finals, Drum Corps International (DCI) presents awards to the corps with the high average scores from prelims, semifinals, and finals in five captions. Prior to 2000 and the adoption of the current scoring format, the Madison Scouts won these captions.

High General Effect Award
 1974 (tie)
High Visual Award
 1975, 1988
High Color Guard Award
1983
High Brass Award
 1973, 1974, 1975, 1995 (3-way tie)

Traditions

Corps logo
Having originated as a unit within the Boy Scouts, the Madison Scouts have historically utilized some form of the fleur-de-lis in their logo. Over the past several decades, different customized fleurs have been created and used to represent the corps. In 2009 the corps developed and officially adopted and a unique fleur and badge logo that is currently in use as the corps' official trademarked logo. The corps' official colors are dark green and white.

Corps song
The Scouts first performed You'll Never Walk Alone as a part of their first field show in 1954.  Challenged by the Cavaliers singing Somewhere, Over The Rainbow in 1957, the corps responded with You'll Never Walk Alone, and it has remained the official corps song to this day.

Female performers
In both the 1971 production of "The Wizard of Oz" and the 2005 production of "The Carmen Project", the Scouts used one female performer in each show.  At VFW Nationals in 1980, 3 women joined the corps as guests in the "American party," which displayed the Wisconsin, American, and VFW flags.  All women were considered "guest performers" of the all-male corps. In 2018, the Scouts featured a female performer for the fourth time in the corps' history, the first ever to be designated a full member.

On July 7, 2019, The Scouts made it official, adopting a "non-discrimination policy that expands membership to all genders to participate in the Madison Scouts, effectively opening the way for women to become members of the corps."

Madison city flag
Corps members Rick and Dennis Stone, assisted by color guard instructor John Fries, designed a flag for the corps' color guard to carry as a flag for the City of Madison, which did not have a city flag. On April 12, 1962 the Madison City Council approved a resolution adopting this flag as the official flag of the city of Madison.  In 2007, to honor the Madison Scouts' seventieth anniversary and the forty-fifth anniversary of its adoption as the city flag, the City of Madison presented a flag to the corps, which the Scouts continue to carry on tour.

Scouting and the Madison Scouts
Throughout most of its history, the corps was an Explorer Troop (Post 600) of the Four Lakes Council. The corps was eventually reassigned as Venturing Crew 600 of the Glacier's Edge Council. In 2011, the corps was reassigned as an Explorer Post.

References

External links
 Madison Drum and Bugle Corps website

Youth organizations based in Wisconsin
Drum Corps International World Class corps
Musical groups from Wisconsin
Culture of Madison, Wisconsin
Musical groups established in 1938
1938 establishments in Wisconsin